Merosity (from the greek "méros," which means "having parts") refers to the number of component parts in a distinct whorl of a plant structure. The term is most commonly used in the context of a flower where it refers to the number of sepals in a whorl of the calyx, the number of petals in a whorl of the corolla, the number of stamens in a whorl of the androecium, or the number of carpels in a whorl of the gynoecium. The term may also be used to refer to the number of leaves in a leaf whorl.

The adjective n-merous refers to a whorl of n parts, where n is any integer greater than one.

In nature, five or three parts per whorl have the highest frequency of occurrence, but four or two parts per whorl are not uncommon. Be aware that two consecutive whorls of dimerous petals are often mistaken for tetramerous petals.

If all of the whorls in a given floral arrangement have the same merosity, the flower is said to be isomerous, otherwise the flower is anisomerous. For example, Trillium is isomerous since all whorls are trimerous (one whorl of three sepals, zero or one whorl of three petals, two whorls of three stamens each, and one whorl of three carpels). Trillium also has one whorl of three leaves.

Gallery

See also
 Cyclic flower
 Floral diagram
 Floral formula

References

Plant morphology